Kampung Chinggung is a village of Orang Asli in Behrang Station, Muallim District, Perak, Malaysia. It is approximately 5 km from Behrang Ulu. It beside on the Banjaran Chilo Titiwangsa.

References

Muallim District
Villages in Perak